The 2020 BRDC British Formula 3 Championship was a motor racing championship for open wheel, formula racing cars held across England. The 2020 season was the fifth and final organised by the British Racing Drivers' Club in the United Kingdom. The championship featured a mix of professional motor racing teams and privately funded drivers, and also featured the 2-litre 230-bhp Tatuus-Cosworth single seat race car in the main series. The season commenced at Oulton Park on 1 August and ended on 8 November at Silverstone Circuit, after seven triple and quadruple header events for a total of twenty-four races. Kaylen Frederick won the drivers' championship ahead of Kush Maini and British driver Louis Foster.

Teams and drivers
All teams are British-registered.

Race calendar and results 

The original calendar was revealed on 14 September 2019.  On 14 May 2020 a revised provisional calendar was announced with a delayed start to the season due to the 2019-20 coronavirus pandemic. On 11 June 2020, the rescheduled calendar was completed to feature 24 races over seven meetings. The series supported British GT.

Championship standings 

 Scoring system

Points were awarded to the top 20 classified finishers in races one, three and four, with the second race awarding points to only the top 15. Race two, which reversed the order of the race one finishers, providing they set a lap time within 103% of the fastest driver, awarded extra points for positions gained from the drivers' respective starting positions.

 Notes

 1 2 3 refers to positions gained and thus extra points earned during race two.

Drivers' championship

Notes

References

External links
 

BRDC British Formula 3 Championship seasons
BRDC Formula 3
BRDC Formula 3
BRDC Formula 3
BRDC British Formula 3